Ho Tsun "Andy" Leung (born 20 October 1990) is a Hong Kong windsurfer. He competed at the 2012 Olympics in the RS:X.

Results

References

External links
 
 
 

1990 births
Living people
Hong Kong male sailors (sport)
Hong Kong windsurfers
Olympic sailors of Hong Kong
Sailors at the 2012 Summer Olympics – RS:X
Asian Games medalists in sailing
Asian Games silver medalists for Hong Kong
Sailors at the 2014 Asian Games
Medalists at the 2014 Asian Games